Palmer Hill may refer to the following:

Palmer Hill (Clinton County, New York)
Palmer Hill (Delaware County, New York)